Chinaman or Chinamen may refer to:

Chinaman (term), a term referring to a Chinese person or a citizen of China

Arts and entertainment

Literature
 The Chinaman (1999), a collection of poems by David Mamet
 The Chinaman (novel), a 1992 novel by Stephen Leather adapted for the screenplay of the 2017 film The Foreigner
 The Chinese, a 2007 novel in Swedish by Henning Mankell, published in English translation in 2010 as The Man from Beijing
 Chinaman: The Legend of Pradeep Mathew, a 2010 novel by Shehan Karunatilaka

Music
 The Chinaman (album), 1992 album by 2 Live Crew member Fresh Kid Ice on Chinaman Records
 "Chinaman", a nickname of rapper Fresh Kid Ice (Chris Wong Won)

Other arts
 Chinaman, the English title of the Danish film  Kinamand
 Chinamen (1970), a play in Michael Frayn's The Two of Us
 "The Chinaman", stage name of American comedian Mark Britten
 Kinamand, a 2005 Danish film whose title translates as Chinaman

Places
 Chinaman Island, an uninhabited island located in Western Port, Victoria, Australia
 Chinaman's Peak, former name of Ha Ling Peak, Mount Lawrence Grassi, Alberta, Canada
 Chinaman's Hat, common name of Mokoliʻi, a basalt island in Kāneʻohe Bay, Hawaii

Other uses
 Chinaman (politics), an epithet for political backers in Chicago, Illinois, U.S., in the 1900s
 Chinaman (porcelain), a dealer in porcelain and chinaware
 Chinaman (ship), any ship engaged in the Old China Trade in the 18th and 19th centuries
 Left-arm unorthodox spin, a style of cricket bowling previously known as a chinaman
 Chinaman's chance, a figure of speech meaning little or no chance
 John Chinaman, a stock caricature of a Chinese laborer seen in cartoons of the 19th century
 Asian conical hat, a simple style of conical hat originating in East and Southeast Asia
 Chinaman's Hat (Port Phillip), an octagonal structure serving as a shipping channel marker in Port Phillip, Victoria, Australia
 Chinaman of Koenigsberg, a label for Immanuel Kant used by Friedrich Nietzsche